The hepatic plexus, the largest offset from the celiac plexus, receives filaments from the left vagus and right phrenic nerves.

It accompanies the hepatic artery, ramifying upon its branches, and upon those of the portal vein in the substance of the liver.

Branches from this plexus accompany all the divisions of the hepatic artery.

A considerable plexus accompanies the gastroduodenal artery and is continued as the inferior gastric plexus on the right gastroepiploic artery along the greater curvature of the stomach, where it unites with offshoots from the lienal plexus. Cystic plexus is the derivation of hepatic plexus.

References

External links

Nerve plexus
Nerves of the torso
Vagus nerve